Sebastian Pasquali is an Australian professional football (soccer) player who plays for Western United in the A-League. A versatile midfielder, Pasquali can play as a box-to-box, holding or attacking midfielder, and has also played at centre-back.

Club career

Melbourne Victory
Pasquali was named in Victory's inaugural youth squad in the National Premier Leagues Victoria in March 2015.

Pasquali made his unofficial senior debut for Melbourne Victory in the 2016 International Champions Cup against Juventus in what was considered a stand out performance, scoring the winning kick in what finished in a 4–3 penalty victory.

Pasquali made his official debut for the Victory in the 2016 FFA Cup on 24 August 2016 against Hume City in the round of 16.

Pasquali made his A-League debut in the Melbourne Derby on 15 October 2016, as a 75th-minute substitute for Fahid Ben Khalfallah. In just his second appearance of the season, as a 76th-minute substitute against Adelaide United on 22 October 2016, Pasquali assisted Marco Rojas's goal in an eventual 2–1 win.

Ajax
After impressing for Victory against Juventus in the International Champions Cup, Juventus showed strong interest in Pasquali, but on 31 October 2016, Melbourne Victory announced that Pasquali had left for Ajax, not listing him in that day's match squad. Pasquali remained in Australia until his year 11 exams were completed in late November, before officially signing for Ajax. Ajax confirmed that Pasquali had signed a two-year deal in November 2016.

Despite having an Italian passport, Pasquali was not able to play competitive matches for Ajax until his transfer clearance from FIFA was granted, missing out on the remainder of the 2016/17 season.

Pasquali started the 2017–18 season as a regular starting player for Ajax in the U19 Eredivisie and UEFA Youth League. He made his debut for Jong Ajax in an Eerste Divisie loss to Fortuna Sittard on 12 January 2018, having previously made three appearances on the bench, going on to play regularly at that level for the remainder of the season.

Pasquali made his first team debut in the 2018–19 preseason as a 61st minute substitution in a friendly match against Steaua Bucharest.

International career
In October 2018, Pasquali was called up to the Australia U20 squad to compete in the 2018 AFC U-19 Championship held in Indonesia.

Career statistics

Footnotes

A.  Includes appearances in the FFA Cup.

Honours

Club
Jong Ajax
 Eerste Divisie: 2017–18

References

External links

Living people
1999 births
Sportsmen from Victoria (Australia)
Australian soccer players
Australia youth international soccer players
Australian people of Italian descent
Association football midfielders
Melbourne Victory FC players
Jong Ajax players
Western United FC players
National Premier Leagues players
A-League Men players
Eerste Divisie players
Soccer players from Victoria (Australia)
Australian expatriate sportspeople in the Netherlands
Australian expatriate soccer players
Expatriate footballers in the Netherlands